= Jimmy Monroe =

Jimmy Monroe may refer to:

- Jimmy Monroe (trombonist), first husband of Billie Holiday
- James Monroe (1758–1831), fifth president of the United States
